Mattia Casadei (born 2 July 1999) is an Italian Grand Prix motorcycle racer, competing in the MotoE World Cup for the Pons Racing 40.

Career statistics

Grand Prix motorcycle racing

By season

By class

Races by year
(key) (Races in bold indicate pole position; races in italics indicate fastest lap)

 Half points awarded as less than two thirds of the race distance (but at least three full laps) was completed.

Supersport World Championship

Races by year
(key) (Races in bold indicate pole position; races in italics indicate fastest lap)

 Season still in progress.

References

External links
 

1999 births
Living people
Moto2 World Championship riders
Italian motorcycle racers
MotoE World Cup riders
Sportspeople from Rimini